Milan Arnejčič (born 18 October 1942) is a former Slovenian football forward.

Career
Born in Maribor, he started playing with NK Železničar Maribor and helps them win the 1960 Slovenian regional cup by scoring two of the four goals of his club in the victory in the final over NK Ljubljana. In 1960, he moves to NK Maribor. During the 1960s he became one of the most prominent Slovenian players.  He was part of Maribor team that got the promotion to the Yugoslav First League in 1967.  He played with Maribor until 1969, making 58 appearances and scoring 15 goals in the top tier during the last two seasons there.

In 1969, he joined Red Star Belgrade, who had been won the Yugoslav championship in the last two seasons in 1968 and 1969.  In the season Milan Arnejčič joined Red Star, the club will win the double (league and cup) with Arnejčič contributing with 12 league appearances and 3 league goals for Red Star's third Yugoslav title in a row.  Red Star was interested in bringing as well Tomislav Prosen and Mladen Kranjc, who, along Arnejčič, were the main players of Maribor, however at the end they only brought Arnejčič in a deal which meant that Milan Janković, Vladislav Bogićević and Rade Radić moved to Maribor.

After winning both national titles with Red Star in only one season, Arnejčič failed to impress, and he moved abroad in summer 1970 by joining Austrian Nationalliga (predecessor of Bundesliga) side Grazer AK. He made 12 league appearances and scored 4 goals in the 1970–71 Austrian football championship in which GAK finished in 11th place.

In summer 1971 Milan Arnejčič returned to his home-town club NK Maribor, still playing in the Yugoslav First League, although in the first season he returned, 1971–72, they finished bottom of the league and were relegated to the Yugoslav Second League.  Despite those events, Milan Arnejčič kept playing with NK Maribor all the way until 1978, when he retired. In total he spent 16 season with Maribor playing 286 matches and scoring 73 goals.

Honours
Red Star
Yugoslav First League: 1969–70
Yugoslav Cup: 1970

See also
List of NK Maribor players

References

1942 births
Living people
Sportspeople from Maribor
Yugoslav footballers
Slovenian footballers
Association football forwards
NK Železničar Maribor players
NK Maribor players
Red Star Belgrade footballers
Yugoslav First League players
Grazer AK players
Expatriate footballers in Austria